The 1913 Akron football team represented the University of Akron, formerly Buchtel College, in the 1913 college football season. The team was led by head coach Frank Haggerty, in his fourth season. Akron was outscored by their opponents by a total of 87–103.

Schedule

References

Akron
Akron Zips football seasons
Akron football